Hans Hutmacher (22 June 1921 – 21 June 1956) was a Swiss racing cyclist. He rode in the 1949 Tour de France.

References

External links
 

1921 births
1956 deaths
People from Bremgarten, Aargau
Swiss male cyclists
Sportspeople from Aargau